O'Brien Field is a 10,000-seat multi-purpose stadium in Charleston, Illinois. It is home to the Eastern Illinois University Panthers football and track and field teams. O’Brien Field is named after Maynard O'Brien who coached football and track at Eastern Illinois University. The stadium features a nine-lane track and in 2004 an artificial turf field was installed. In 2009 a state of the art scoreboard was installed on the north end of the field with a video board and new sound system.

The stadium served as the summer home for the former St. Louis Cardinals football team in 1976 and 1977 and again from 1982 to 1987.

The record attendance for O'Brien Field was 12,600 on November 9, 1980, vs. Northern Iowa. The all-time record for the Panthers football team at O'Brien Field is 178–95–3 as of the end of the 2019 season.

The stadium also plays host to the IHSA State Finals in track and field every year.

Home records

Attendance

^Low attendance due to the COVID-19 pandemic.

Attendance records
The following are the highest attendances at O’Brien Field as of the end of the 2019 NCAA football season.

See also
 List of NCAA Division I FCS football stadiums

References

External links
 O'Brien Field

Athletics (track and field) venues in Illinois
College football venues
Eastern Illinois Panthers football
Multi-purpose stadiums in the United States
American football venues in Illinois
Buildings and structures in Coles County, Illinois
Sports venues completed in 1970
1970 establishments in Illinois
College track and field venues in the United States